Hodge Bank is a bank in the United Kingdom. It is named after Sir Julian Hodge. The bank was formed in 1987 as Julian Hodge Bank, and is headquartered in Cardiff, Wales.

In 1965 the bank founded the Hodge Life Assurance Company, a subsidiary company which has been rebranded as Hodge Lifetime.

References

External links

 Hodge Bank

Banks established in 1987
Companies based in Cardiff
Banks of Wales